Norm Dugdell (17 November 1906 – 10 January 1979) was an  Australian rules footballer who played with North Melbourne in the Victorian Football League (VFL).

Notes

External links 

1906 births
1979 deaths
Australian rules footballers from Victoria (Australia)
North Melbourne Football Club players